Diogo Oliveira may refer to:

 Diogo Oliveira (footballer, born 1982), Brazilian football midfielder
 Diogo Oliveira (footballer, born 1983) (1983–2021), Brazilian football forward
 Diogo Oliveira (footballer, born 1986), Brazilian football defensive midfielder
 Diogo (footballer, born 1988), Diogo da Costa Oliveira, Brazilian football wing-back
 Diogo de Olivera (born 1996), Brazilian football forward